Donald Leigh Nicholas (October 30, 1930 — October 23, 2007) was an American professional baseball player who played from 1948 to 1959.

Nicholas originally signed with the Brooklyn Dodgers and was a successful base stealer during his minor league career, surpassing the 30-stolen-base mark at least three times during his career. Purchased by the White Sox after the 1951 minor league season, Nicholas made his MLB debut on April 16, 1952, when he pinch ran for Eddie Robinson in a 1–0 defeat at the hands of the Cleveland Indians. The following day, he pinch hit for pitcher Howie Judson and was retired by Mike Garcia. Four days later, he batted for Hal Brown and bounced out to St. Louis Browns pitcher Ned Garver.  After spending the rest of 1952 and all of 1953 in the White Sox' farm system, Nicholas made Chicago's opening day roster in 1954. He pinch hit once (and received a base on balls) and scored three runs, but was sent to the Triple-A Havana Sugar Kings at the May cutdown date and played the rest of his career in the minors.

References

External links

1930 births
2007 deaths
Cambridge Dodgers players
Charleston Senators players
Chicago White Sox players
Elmira Pioneers players
Havana Sugar Kings players
Memphis Chickasaws players
Mobile Bears players
Nashville Vols players
Newport News Dodgers players
Portland Beavers players
St. Paul Saints (AA) players
Savannah Reds players
Seattle Rainiers players
Baseball players from Phoenix, Arizona
American expatriate baseball players in Cuba